The Tribune is an Indian English-language daily newspaper published from Amritsar, Jalandhar, Ludhiana, Bathinda, Chandigarh and New Delhi. It was founded on 2 February 1881, in Lahore, Punjab (now in Pakistan), by Sardar Dyal Singh Majithia, a philanthropist, and is run by a trust comprising five persons as trustees. It is a major Indian newspaper with a worldwide circulation. In India, it is among the leading English daily for Punjab, Haryana, Himachal Pradesh, and the Union Territory of Chandigarh.

Overview
The present Editor-in-Chief of The Tribune is Rajesh Ramachandran. Previously he was editor-in-chief of Outlook magazine.
Ramachandran succeeded Harish Khare, who was appointed editor-in-chief of the Tribune Group of newspapers on 1 June 2015, serving until 15 March 2018.

The Tribune has two sister publications: Dainik Tribune (in Hindi) and Punjabi Tribune (in Punjabi). Naresh Kaushal, an eminent name in the field of Journalism in North India is the Editor of Dainik Tribune and prominent Punjabi playwright Swaraj Bir Singh is the editor of the Punjabi Tribune. The online edition of The Tribune was launched in July 1998, and the online editions of the Punjabi Tribune and Dainik Tribune were launched on 16 August 2010.  

All three newspapers are published by the Tribune Trust. Narinder Nath Vohra is the current president of the Tribune Trust, which comprises S. S. Sodhi, S. S. Mehta, and Gurbachan Jagat as trustees. 

The Tribune has had Kali Nath Roy, Prem Bhatia, Hari Jai Singh, H.K. Dua, and Raj Chengappa among others, as its editors-in-chief in the past.

Similar to most Indian newspapers, The Tribune receives most of its revenue from advertisements over subscriptions.

See also
Yog Joy, an Indian photojournalist

References

External links 
 

1881 establishments in India
Companies based in Chandigarh
English-language newspapers published in India
Mass media in Haryana
Mass media in Punjab, India
Publications established in 1881